Danny Steele (born 10 October 1982) is an English footballer who played in The Football League as a defender.

Career
Steele began his career at Millwall, where he was handed a three-month pro contract having shown excellent form for the under-19 team. At the end of the 2001–02 season, Steele was released along with six other players. Steele played for the Colchester United reserves in their final game against Gillingham at the end of the 2001–02 season, and took part in a further game organised by manager Steve Whitton to take a further look at him. He signed for Colchester on a non-contract basis after impressing while on trial at the club, having played in all the U's pre-season friendlies and making a solid impression on Whitton. After making eight league appearances for Colchester, the former Millwall player had failed to hold down a regular first team place and had his contract cancelled by mutual consent. He had only made one substitute appearance for the U's since he had been sent off after 15 minutes in a draw with Barnsley in October 2002. Steele then joined non-league Fisher Athletic in 2003.

References

External links
 Danny Steele at Colchester United Archive Database

1982 births
Living people
Footballers from Southwark
Association football defenders
English footballers
Colchester United F.C. players
Fisher Athletic F.C. players
Millwall F.C. players
English Football League players